Werner Ehrig (22 April 1897 – 31 January 1981) was a German general in the Wehrmacht during World War II. He was a recipient of the Knight's Cross of the Iron Cross of Nazi Germany.

Awards and decorations

 Knight's Cross of the Iron Cross on 26 May 1940 as Oberstleutnant and Chief of Operations in the General Staff of 22. Infanterie-Division

References

Citations

Bibliography

1897 births
1981 deaths
German Army personnel of World War I
German prisoners of war in World War II
Lieutenant generals of the German Army (Wehrmacht)
People from Eibenstock
People from the Kingdom of Saxony
Recipients of the clasp to the Iron Cross, 1st class
Recipients of the Gold German Cross
Recipients of the Knight's Cross of the Iron Cross
Recipients of the Order of the Star of Romania
Military personnel from Saxony